Hosam Aiesh (born 14 April 1995) is a professional footballer who plays as a right winger for FC Seoul and the Syria national team. Born in Sweden, Aiesh represented them at both youth and senior level before switching his allegiance to Syria in 2022.

Club career
Hosam Aiesh began his career in academy of Swedish side BK Häcken. After spending a season on loan at the Varbergs BolS in 2014, he joined Östersunds FK on 1 January 2015 on a free transfer. However on 1 April 2016 he re-joined Varbergs BolS on loan until 1 July 2016.

In 2017, Aiesh managed to win his first major trophy, the 2017 Svenska Cupen, after Östersund defeated IFK Norrköping 4–1 in the final, as a result of the victory, also qualifying for the 2017–18 UEFA Europa League, marking their first appearance in a European competition tournament. In their Europa League debut in the second qualifying round on 13 July 2017. Östersund earned a shock 2–0 victory against Turkish giants Galatasaray at the Jämtkraft Arena and eliminated them after a 1–1 draw in Istanbul.

Aiesh's teammate Saman Ghoddos scored 2 goals in a win against PAOK on 24 August saw them qualify for the Group Stage at the first time of asking,  After losing only one game in their campaign, they finished second in a group featuring Athletic Bilbao and Hertha Berlin, becoming the first Swedish club to progress beyond the Europa League group stage since UEFA rebranded the UEFA Cup into Europa League.

Östersund were knocked out by English side Arsenal, after Östersund lost the 1st leg 2–0, they beat Arsenal in the 2nd leg at the Emirates Stadium with a 2–1 victory after a goal from Aiesh and his teammate Ken Sema.

Hosam Aiesh joined IFK Göteborg in 2019.

Hosam Aiesh joined FC Seoul in 2023.

International career

Sweden
Born in Sweden to Palestinian Syrian parents, Aiesh is eligible to represent Palestine, Syria and Sweden. In August 2017, he declared his intent to represent Palestine. However, he was called up for Sweden on 3 December 2018 and earned his only cap on 9 January 2019 when he started for Sweden in a friendly against Finland. Due to the fact that his only cap for Sweden came in a friendly, he remained eligible for Syria and Palestine.

Syria
On 1 February 2022, Aiesh debuted for Syria in a 2–0 loss to South Korea in qualification towards the 2022 FIFA World Cup entering the match as a substitute in the 60th minute for Amro Jenyat.

Career statistics

Club

Notes

Honours
Östersunds FK
Svenska Cupen: 2017
IFK Göteborg
Svenska Cupen: 2020

Individual
Allsvenskan Top assist provider: 2018

References

External links
 
 
 
 Footballdatabase Profile

1995 births
Living people
Footballers from Gothenburg
Syrian footballers
Syria international footballers
Swedish footballers
Sweden international footballers
Sweden youth international footballers
Syrian people of Palestinian descent
Swedish people of Palestinian descent
Swedish people of Syrian descent
Association football midfielders
Dual internationalists (football)
K League 1 players
Östersunds FK players
BK Häcken players
Varbergs BoIS players
IFK Göteborg players
Allsvenskan players
Superettan players
FC Seoul players